Sushil Parashar is a veteran Indian actor, known for his work in the Hindi television industry and in Bollywood. His films include Jaal: The Trap; Dushmani; Neal N Nikki; and Hulla. He works mostly in mainstream television serials like Bani – Ishq Da Kalma and is appearing in Balaji Telefilms's supernatural horror fiction TV show Kavach... MahaShivratri

Television
 Maryada: Lekin Kab Tak? as Prabhat Pradhan
 7RCR as Ambalal Khosti, RSS Pracharak
 Bani – Ishq Da Kalma
 Devon Ke Dev...Mahadev as Sage Pitamber
 Aek Chabhi Hai Padoss Mein
 Satrangi Sasural
 Khushiyan
 Shanti
 Hum Sab Ek Hain in Episode 17 as Baba Hariyali (1998)
 Hero - Bhakti Hi Shakti Hai (2007) as Dr. Darr aka masoom sir
 Kavach... MahaShivratri (2019) as Veerendar Patwardhan
 Gud Se Meetha Ishq as Mr. Khurana (2022)
 Pishachini as Ayodhya Singh Rajput (2022)

Filmography
 Jamun
 Swaha (2010)
 Hulla (2008)
 Chain Kulii Ki Main Kulii (2007) - Bholu Dada
 Neal N Nikki (2005) - Gyaniji
 Jaal: The Trap (2003)
 Dushmani: A Violent Love Story (1996)
 Raghuveer (1995)
 Jogger's Park

References

External links

Living people
Indian male television actors
Male actors in Hindi cinema
Year of birth missing (living people)